Miguel Alfonso Pérez Aracil (born 28 May 1980) is a Spanish retired footballer who played as a midfielder.

Club career
Pérez was born in Madrid. During his career, spent mostly in the second division, he represented CD Onda (Villarreal CF's farm team), Getafe CF, CD Numancia (appearing in 19 games in 2004–05's La Liga), Gimnàstic de Tarragona, Deportivo Alavés and Levante UD. He made his debut in the Spanish top flight on 28 August 2004, coming on as a first-half substitute to help Numancia to a 1–1 home draw against Real Betis.

Pérez contributed 18 matches – only two complete, 842 minutes, no goals – in the 2009–10 season, as Levante returned to the top division after two years. Aged 30, he was released in the 2011 January transfer window, without no official appearances whatsoever in the first half of the campaign.

Personal life
Pérez's younger brother, Alejandro, was also a footballer. He played in Real Madrid's youth academy, and both represented Catalonia' Gimnàstic in 2005–06.

Their father, Miguel Ángel, was also involved in the sport. Born in Argentina, he settled in Spain after retiring, having played in the country for Real Madrid and Real Zaragoza amongst other clubs.

References

External links

1980 births
Living people
Spanish people of Argentine descent
Footballers from Madrid
Spanish footballers
Association football midfielders
La Liga players
Segunda División players
Segunda División B players
Getafe CF footballers
CD Numancia players
Gimnàstic de Tarragona footballers
Deportivo Alavés players
Levante UD footballers